Mlaḥsô or Mlahsö, sometimes referred to as Suryoyo or Surayt, is an extinct or dormant Central Neo-Aramaic language. It was traditionally spoken in eastern Turkey and later also in northeastern Syria by Syriac Orthodox Christians.

The Mlaḥsô language (Surayt of Mlaḥsô) is closely related to the Surayt of Turabdin but sufficiently different
to be considered a separate language, with the syntax of the language having retained more features of Classical Syriac than Turoyo. It was spoken in the villages of Mlaḥsô, a village established by two monks from the Tur Abdin mountain range, and in the village of ˁAnşa near Lice, Diyarbakır, Turkey.

Etymology
The name of the village and the language is derived from the earlier Aramaic word mālaḥtā, 'salt marsh'. The literary Syriac name for the language is Mlaḥthoyo. The native speakers of Mlaḥsô referred to their language simply as Suryô, or Syriac.

History and distribution
The language was still spoken by a handful of people in the 1970s. The last fluent native speaker of Mlaḥsô, Ibrahim Ḥanna, died in 1998 in Qamishli. His daughters, Munira in Qamishlo, Shamiram in Lebanon, and son Dr. Isḥaq Ibrahim in Germany are the only speakers left with some limited native proficiency of the language. Recordings of Ibrahim Ḥanna speaking the language are available on Heidelberg University's Semitic Sound Archive which were done by Otto Jastrow, a prominent German semiticist who is credited as the modern "discoverer" of the language and published the first modern research papers on the existence of Mlaḥsô and its linguistic features.

On 3 May 2009, a historical event in the history of the Mlaḥsô Surayt language took place. The Suroyo TV television station aired the program series Dore w yawmotho, which was about the village Mlaḥsô (and the Tur Abdin village Tamarze). Dr. Isḥaq Ibrahim, the son of Ibrahim Ḥanna, was a guest and spoke in the Mlaḥsô language with his sisters Shamiram in Lebanon and Munira in Qamishli live on the phone. Otto Jastrow was also interviewed regarding his expertise on Mlaḥsô. Turabdin Assyrians/Syriacs viewers and those present at the show could for the first time ever in modern times hear the language live.

The extinction of Mlaḥsô can be attributed to the small amount of original speakers of the language, and them being limited to two isolated villages, resulting in a disproportionate loss of speakers during the Assyrian genocide compared to Turoyo and other variants of Neo-Aramaic.

Phonology
Mlahsô is phonologically less conservative than Turoyo. This is particularly noticeable in the use of s and z for classical θ and ð. The classical v has been retained though, while it has collapsed into w in Turoyo. Also sometimes y (IPA /j/) replaces ġ. Mlaḥsô also renders the combination of vowel plus y as a single, fronted vowel rather than a diphthong or a glide.

Consonants

Vowels 
Mlahsô has the following set of vowels:
 Close front unrounded vowel – 
 Close-mid front unrounded vowel – 
 Open front unrounded vowel – 
 Open back rounded vowel – 
 Close back rounded vowel –

Morphology 
Mlaḥsô is more conservative than Turoyo in grammar and vocabulary, using classical Syriac words and constructions while also preserving the original Aramaic form.

Vocabulary

Example phrases

Example sentences

See also 
Surayt of Turabdin
Syriac language
Assyrian people

References

Jastrow, Otto (1994). Der neuaramäische Dialekt von Mlaḥsô. Wiesbaden: Harrassowitz. .

Further reading
 Goldenberg, Gideon. 2000. "Early Neo-Aramaic and Present-day Dialectical Diversity." In Journal of Semitic Studies XLV/1, 69-86. Jerusalem.
 Hoberman, Robert D. 1988.  "The History of the Modern Aramaic Pronouns and Pronominal Suffixes." In Journal of the American Oriental Society 108, no. 4, 557-575. American Oriental Society.
Jastrow, Otto. 1997. "16. The Neo-Aramaic Languages."  In The Semitic Languages, edited by Robert Hetzron, 334–377. New York: Routledge.
 Jastrow, Otto. 1996. "Passive Formation in Turoyo and Mlahso." In Israel Oriental Studies XVI: Studies in Modern Semitic Languages, edited by Shlomo Izre’el, 49–57. Leiden: Brill.
 Jastrow, Otto. 1994. Der neuaramäische Dialekt von Mlaḥsô. Semitica Viva 14. Wiesbaden: Harrassowitz
 Khan, Geoffrey. 1999. "The Neo-Aramaic Dialect Spoken by Jews from the Region of Arbel (Iraqi Kurdistan)." In Bulletin of the School of Oriental and African Studies, University of London 62, no. 2, 213-225.
 Khan, Geoffrey. 2003. "Some Remarks on Linguistic and Lexical Change in the North Eastern Neo-Aramaic Dialects." In Aramaic Studies 1, no. 2, 179-190.
 Mutzafi, Hezy. 2006. "On the Etymology of Some Enigmatic Words in northeastern Neo-Aramaic." In Aramaic Studies 4, no. 1, 83-99.

External links
 Suroyo TV 2009-05-03 Dore w yawmotho - Mlaḥso & Tamarze
 Semitisches Tonarchiv: Dokumentgruppe "Aramäisch/Mlahsô" (text in German)
 Endangered Languages Project - Mlahso 

Eastern Aramaic languages
Neo-Aramaic languages
Languages of Syria
Languages of Turkey
Endangered Afroasiatic languages
Languages of Kurdistan